Arm River-Watrous was a provincial electoral district for the Legislative Assembly of Saskatchewan, Canada. This constituency was located in south central Saskatchewan. It was dissolved as part of an election boundary redraw in 2013 primarily into Arm River.

Grain farming and cattle ranching are the major economic activities of the area. Wynyard is home to the larger industries in this constituency. They include: Sunnyland Poultry Products, Big Quill Resources (Canada's largest manufacturer of potassium sulphate), and Cargill. Watrous is well known for the healing waters of Little Manitou Lake and its Mineral Spa. This resort community there, Manitou Beach, hosts visitors from around the world. Blackstrap Provincial Park is also located in this constituency. The three largest communities are Wynyard with a population of 1,919, Watrous with a population of 1,808 and Davidson (1,035).

Geography

Towns

 Davidson
 Dundurn
 Govan
 Hanley
 Imperial

 Nokomis
 Raymore
 Watrous
 Wynyard

Villages

 Bladworth
 Dafoe
 Drake
 Duval
 Girvin
 Hawarden
 Jansen
 Kenaston

 Liberty
 Loreburn
 Quinton
 Semans
 Simpson
 Strongfield
 Young

Resort Villages
 Etters Beach
 Manitou Beach

Rural Municipalities

 Touchwood No. 248
 Last Mountain Valley No. 250
 Big Arm No. 251
 Arm River No. 252
 Willner No. 253
 Loreburn No. 254
 Kutawa No. 278
 Mount Hope No. 279
 Wreford No. 280
 Wood Creek No. 281

 McCraney No. 282
 Rosedale No. 283
 Big Quill No. 308
 Prairie Rose No. 309
 Usborne No. 310
 Morris No. 312
 Lost River No. 313
 Dundurn No. 314
 Viscount No. 341

First Nations
 Day Star First Nation
 Kawacatoose First Nation

Hutterite Colonies
 Clear Springs
 Hillcrest

Parks
 Blackstrap Provincial Park
 Manitou and District Regional Park
 Last Mountain Regional Park
 Wynyard and District Regional Park

Riding
This riding was created by The Representation Act, 2002 (Saskatchewan). Prior to the act, this constituency was a part of the Arm River, Last Mountain-Touchwood, and Watrous constituencies. The former riding of Arm River makes up much of the new riding.

Member of the Legislative Assembly

 Previous MLAs:
 Arm River: Greg P. Brkich, Saskatchewan Party
 Watrous: Donna Harpauer, Saskatchewan Party
 Last Mountain-Touchwood: Glen Hart, Saskatchewan Party

Election results

References

External links
Saskatchewan Archives Board – Saskatchewan Election Results By Electoral Division
Elections Saskatchewan - Official Results of the 2011 Provincial Election
Website of the Legislative Assembly of Saskatchewan

Former provincial electoral districts of Saskatchewan